The 2008 Cork Senior Football Championship was the 120th staging of the Cork Senior Football Championship since its establishment by the Cork County Board in 1887. The draw for the opening fixtures took place in December 2007. The championship began on 18 April 2008 and ended on 5 October 2008.

Nemo Rangers entered the championship as the defending champions.

On 5 October 2008, Nemo Rangers won the championship following a 0-13 to 0-05 defeat of Douglas in the final. This was their 17th championship title overall and their fourth title in succession.

James Masters from the Nemo Rangers club was the championship's top scorer with 1-30.

Team changes

To Championship

Promoted from the Cork Premier Intermediate Football Championship
 Mallow

From Championship

Relegated to the Cork Premier Intermediate Football Championship
 St. Finbarr's
 St. Vincent's

Results

Divisions/colleges section

Round 1

Round 2

Relegation play-offs

Round 3

Quarter-finals

Semi-finals

Final

Championship statistics

Top scorers

Top scorers overall

Top scorers in a single game

Miscellaneous
 Nemo Rangers are the first club to win four titles in a row.
 Douglas qualify for the final for the first time.

References

Cork Senior Football Championship
Cork Senior Football Championship